Albert Collins Greene (April 15, 1792January 8, 1863) was an American lawyer and politician from Rhode Island. He served as a United States senator and Attorney General of Rhode Island.

Early life
Greene was born in East Greenwich, Rhode Island and graduated from Kent Academy. He studied law, was admitted to the bar in 1812, and completed his legal training at the Litchfield Law School in Litchfield, Connecticut, from 1812-1813. He commenced the practice of law in East Greenwich.

Political career
He was a member of the Rhode Island House of Representatives from 1815-1825, serving as speaker of the State House from 1821-1825. He was brigadier general, and then major general, of the Fourth Brigade of State Militia from 1816-1823. He served as attorney general of Rhode Island from 1825-1843. In 1827, he received the honorary degree of Master of Arts from Brown University.

Greene was a member of the Rhode Island Senate from 1843-1844, and was elected as a Whig candidate to the U.S. Senate, serving from March 4, 1845, to March 3, 1851; he was not a candidate for reelection, and was elected to the Rhode Island Senate in 1851 and 1852. In 1857, he was again a member of the Rhode Island House of Representatives.

He retired from public life, and died in Providence; interment was in Grace Church Cemetery.

Family life
Greene was the son of Perry Greene and Elizabeth (Belcher) Greene. On May 16, 1814, Greene married Catherine Celia Greene, daughter of Rhode Island Governor William Greene. He and Catherine had five children: William Albert Greene, Mary Eliza Greene, Ann Frances Greene, Catharine Celia Greene and Susan Eliza Greene. Their daughter Catherine married Richard Ward Greene, Chief Justice of the Rhode Island Supreme Court. After his wife Catherine died, he married Julia Bourne on August 22, 1841.

Greene's uncle was Nathanael Greene, a major general of the Continental Army in the American Revolutionary War.

References

External links

 Portrait of Albert C. Greene
 
	
	

1792 births
1863 deaths
Rhode Island Attorneys General
Speakers of the Rhode Island House of Representatives
Members of the Rhode Island House of Representatives
Rhode Island state senators
United States senators from Rhode Island
Rhode Island lawyers
People from East Greenwich, Rhode Island
Rhode Island Whigs
19th-century American politicians
Whig Party United States senators
People from Kent County, Rhode Island
Politicians from Providence, Rhode Island
People from Providence County, Rhode Island
Brown University alumni
Litchfield Law School alumni
Burials in Rhode Island
19th-century American lawyers
American militia officers
Greene family of Rhode Island